This was the first edition of the tournament.

Frederik Nielsen and Joe Salisbury won the title after defeating Luke Bambridge and Jonny O'Mara 3–6, 6–3, [10–4] in the final.

Seeds

Draw

References
 Main Draw

Loughborough Trophy - Doubles